Günther Schäfer (born 9 June 1962 in Waiblingen) is a German football coach and a former player.

In his sixteen years playing for VfB Stuttgart, the defender gained the status of being one of the most popular players ever to play for the Swabian  Bundesliga side and one of the few players to earn two German championship titles with them. The most spectacular and well-known play of Schäfer's career was to clear a ball from the goal line by a bicycle kick, risking injury, in the final match of the 1991–92 season against Bayer Leverkusen, which Stuttgart went on to win 2–1, thus gaining the German championship title that season.

Today, Schäfer is the head coach of VfB's youth acamde.y

Honours
VfB Stuttgart
 UEFA Cup finalist: 1989
 Bundesliga: 1984, 1992
 DFB-Pokal finalist: 1986
 DFL-Supercup: 1992

References

1962 births
Living people
People from Waiblingen
Sportspeople from Stuttgart (region)
Footballers from Baden-Württemberg
Association football defenders
German footballers
Germany under-21 international footballers
German football managers
VfB Stuttgart players
Arminia Bielefeld players
Bundesliga players
West German footballers
VfB Stuttgart non-playing staff